is a Japanese voice actress who is affiliated with Ken Production. She is originally from Kurume, Fukuoka Prefecture. She voices Uzume in Ai Yori Aoshi, Rin Kamishiro in Maburaho, Anju Maaka in Karin, Tabitha in The Familiar of Zero, Nao Yorihime in Yosuga no Sora, and Ai in Dragon Crisis!. Other roles include Momiji in Maple Colors, Aoi Niiyama in Akiiro Renka, Chisa in Gift, Kana Suoin in Otome wa Boku ni Koishiteru, Mikan in Wanko to Kuraso, Yui Kuroda in Hoshiuta.

Filmography

Anime

Film

Video games
{| class="wikitable sortable plainrowheaders"
|+ List of voice performances in video games
! Year
! Title
! Role
! class="unsortable"| Notes
! class="unsortable"| Source
|-
|  || Unlimited Saga || Judy, Michel || PS1/PS2 || 
|-
|  || One: Kagayaku Kisetsu e || Nagamori MizuhoKei長森瑞佳 || PC Adult || 
|-
|  || Ai Yori Aoshi || Uzume || PS1/PS2 || 
|-
|  || After... || Rū || PC Adult || 
|-
| –05 || Maple Colors games || Momiji Akiho || PC Adult || 
|-
|  || Tsuki wa Higashi ni Hi wa Nishi ni: Operation Sanctuary || Yui Nonohara ||  || 
|-
| –05 || Night Shift Nurses: Sun || Yu Yagami || PC Adult, related videos || 
|-
|  || Otome wa Boku ni Koishiteru || Kana Suōin || PC Adult || 
|-
|  || Akiiro Renka || Aoi Shinyama || PC Adult || 
|-
|  || Tears to Tiara || Rimurisuリムリス || PC Adult || 
|-
| –15 || Tsuyokiss ||  Sunao Konoe || Also as Mirai Yamada || 
|-
| –06 || Gift games || Chisa Fujimiya || PC Adult, As Ayaka Kimura || 
|-
| –06 || Negima! games || Zazie Rainyday || PS1/PS2 || 
|-
|  || Canvas 2 || Saya Saginomiya || PS1/PS2 || 
|-
|  || Maho Tama Series || Mei || PC Adult, As Ayaka Kimura || 
|-
|  || Wanko to Kurasō || Mikan || PC Adult || 
|-
|  || Crayon Shin-chan strongest family Kasukabe King Wie -クレヨンしんちゃん 最強家族カスカベキング うぃ～ || Sakiサキ || Wii || 
|-
| –10 || Koihime Musou || Totaku (Dong Zhuo) || PC AdultMana: Month || 
|-
| –08 || The Familiar of Zero games || Tabitha || PS1/PS2 || 
|-
|  || Buso Renkin games || Chisato Wakamiya若宮千里 || PS1/PS2 || 
|-
| –10 || Time Leap || Yu Hayama || As Suzuharataruto || 
|-
|  || Princess Lover! || Yu Fujikura藤倉優 || PC Adult, Also as Ayaka Kimura, also sequel in 2010 || 
|-
|  || Haruiro Ouse || Haruna Okazaki岡崎春奈 || PC AdultSawano Milica name || 
|-
|  || Yosuga no Sora || Nao Yorihime || PC Adult, As Ayaka Kimura || 
|-
|  || Hoshiuta || Yui Kuroda || PC Adult, As Ayaka Kimura || 
|-
|  || Love, Election and Chocolate || Ai Saure || PC Adult, As Chiyoko Sato, also portable in 2012 || 
|-
|  || Axanael || Noko || PC Adult, As Ayaka Kimura || 
|-
|  || Kajiri Kamui Kagura || Tenma Numahime || PC Adult, As Ayaka Kimura, also Hikari in 2013 || 
|-
|  || Maji de Watashi ni Koi Shinasai! S || Sayaka Mayuzumi黛 紗也佳 || PC AdultAs Ayaka Kimura || 
|-
|  || Generation of Chaos 6 || Sasha || PSP || 
|-
|  || Granblue Fantasy || Anna || Mobile / Browser / PC || 
|-
|}

Drama CDs

References

 Taniguchi, Hiroshi et al. "The Official Art of Canvas2 ~Nijiiro no Sketch~". (November 2006) Newtype USA''. pp. 101–107.

External links
 Official agency profile at Ken Production 
 
 Yuka Inokuchi at Visual Novel Database

1978 births
Living people
People from Kurume
Voice actresses from Fukuoka Prefecture
Japanese voice actresses
20th-century Japanese actresses
21st-century Japanese actresses
Ken Production voice actors